

1982

See also
1982 in Australia
1982 in Australian television

References

External links 
 Australian film at the Internet Movie Database

1982
Lists of 1982 films by country or language
Films